Andrew Ivan Bell (born 25 April 1964) is an English singer-songwriter and lead singer of the synth-pop duo Erasure. The band achieved mainstream success (receiving a Brit Award for Best British Group) and are popular within the LGBT community, for whom the openly gay Bell has become an icon.

Erasure have penned over 200 songs and have sold over 25 million albums worldwide. They have achieved five consecutive number ones on the UK Albums Chart. Hit singles include "A Little Respect", "Sometimes" and  "Always". Bell is known for his soulful voice and flamboyant stage persona, which contrast with bandmate Vince Clarke's low-key, deadpan demeanour.

His solo career includes the studio albums Electric Blue (2005), Non-Stop (2010),  and iPop (2014).

Early life
Bell grew up in the Dogsthorpe area of Peterborough. His family still reside in the city and surrounding areas such as Market Deeping. Bell was educated at the King's School in the city.

Career
In 1985, during a period in which he worked selling women's shoes and was performing in a band called the Void, he responded to a newspaper advertisement for a singer. Vince Clarke had been Bell's "hero"; Bell was successful in his audition and together they formed the group Erasure.

Bell sang the role of Montresor in the opera The Fall of the House of Usher by Peter Hammill and Judge Smith, released in 1991 and reissued with a new recording in 1999.

Bell's first solo studio album was announced in July 2005. He signed a worldwide solo recording contract with Sanctuary Records, and announced details of his debut album, released on 3 October 2005 and entitled Electric Blue. The album featured fourteen tracks, including three duets, with Claudia Brücken of Propaganda and Jake Shears of Scissor Sisters.

The first single, "Crazy", released on 26 September 2005, included club remixes from his Erasure partner Vince Clarke, plus Cicada, MHC and King Roc. Electric Blue was co-written and recorded throughout 2004 and 2005 with Manhattan Clique (Philip Larsen and Chris Smith) who have worked with Erasure, Moby, the B-52s, Stereophonics and Goldfrapp.

Bell released his second solo studio album, Non-Stop, on 7 June 2010.  It was co-written and co-produced by Bell and Pascal Gabriel, who previously remixed "It Doesn't Have to Be" for Erasure. It also features a collaboration with Perry Farrell of Jane's Addiction.

Using the pseudonym Mimó, Bell released two Pascal Gabriel-produced singles on Mute Records: "Running Out" (2009) and "Will You Be There?" (2010) prior to his second solo album.  The name, used as a "tribute to good friend Tomeau Mimó”, was not used on any subsequent solo releases, as a legal block was issued against Bell by another artist already using the Mimó name. Both songs appear on Non-Stop and have since been re-branded as Andy Bell.

In June 2011, he appeared on the second season of ITV series Popstar to Operastar and finished in fifth place.

Charity

Bell has also donated time and made recordings for charities. These include Ferry Aid's cover of "Let It Be" (1987); a cover of Cole Porter's "Too Darn Hot", that was included in 1990s Red Hot + Blue album to raise funds for AIDS and HIV research; re-making Lene Lovich's "Rage" alongside her to be included in PETA'''s album (1991) in favour of a wildlife campaign; and performing twice on Big Spender's Red Hot and Dance events to support various AIDS projects (in both December 1994 and November 2004). Bell also performed on the True Colours Tour 2008.

Personal life
Bell is openly gay, and has had long-time partners. The first, Paul M. Hickey, died on 11 April 2012 at the age of 62. In January 2013, Bell married his subsequent partner Stephen Moss.

On 17 December 2004, Bell publicly announced that he has been HIV-positive since 1998. In a 2007 interview, he remarked that there is a complacency among gay men about HIV:

Bell suffers from avascular necrosis. He has had both hips replaced, which keeps him from "pogoing around" in more recent performances.

Solo discography
Albums
 2005: Electric Blue (SANCD382) - UK No. 119, U.S. Electronic Albums No. 12
 2010: Non-Stop - UK No. 134, UK Dance Albums No. 12

Shelter featuring Andy Bell albums
 2014: iPop with Shelter (CD/digital) - iTunes UK Pop Album Chart No. 47
 2015: iPop Deluxe with Shelter (CD/vinyl/digital)

Torsten stage and music series and remixes

 2014: Torsten the Bareback Saint (CD, hardback book)
 2015: Variance – The 'Torsten the Bareback Saint' Remixes (CD/digital)
 2016: Torsten the Beautiful Libertine (CD/digital)
 2016: Variance – 'The Torsten the Beautiful Libertine' Remixes  (CD/digital)
 2019: Torsten in Queereteria''  (CD/digital)

Singles
 2005: "Crazy" - UK No. 35, U.S. Dance No. 3
 2006: "I'll Never Fall in Love Again" - UK No. 96
 2009: "Running Out" (as Mimó)
 2010: "Will You Be There?" (as Mimó) - U.S. Dance No. 27
 2010: "Call on Me"
 2010: "Non-Stop"
 2013: "Breathing Love" (with Isaac Junkie) (CD Part 1/CD Part 2) 
 2014: "Aftermath (Here We Go)" (with Dave Aude) - U.S. Dance No. 1
 2014: "Beautiful" (with Shelter)
 2014: "I Don't Like"
 2014: "Friend" (with Shelter)
 2014: "Fountain of Youth"
 2015: "Weston-Super-Mare"
 2016: "True Original" (with Dave Aude)
 2016: "My Precious One"
 2016: "Queercore" (Matt Pop Remix)
 2016: "We Were Singing Along to Liza" (Shelter Remix)
 2017: "Runaway" (with Dave Aude)

Remixes
 2008: Yazoo – "Nobody's Diary" (Andy Bell & JC Remix)

See also
 List of synthpop artists

References

External links

 Official Andy Bell site
 Official Erasure site
 
 
 

1964 births
Living people
British synth-pop new wave musicians
Male new wave singers
English pop singers
20th-century English male singers
21st-century English male singers
Erasure members
Remixers
Popstar to Operastar contestants
Sony Music Publishing artists
English LGBT songwriters
Gay singers
English LGBT singers
Gay songwriters
English gay musicians
People with HIV/AIDS
People educated at The King's School, Peterborough
Musicians from Cambridgeshire
People from Peterborough
Place of birth missing (living people)
20th-century English LGBT people
21st-century English LGBT people